Serwaa Amihere  (born March 8, 1990) is a Ghanaian broadcast journalist and news presenter who currently works with GHOne TV. She won the Television Female Newscaster of the Year Award at the 2018 Radio and Television Personality Awards. 

She started as the producer of the award-winning current affairs show, State of Affairs hosted by Nana Aba Anamoah. She is the host of Cheers, a weekend sports show telecast on GHOne TV.

Early life and education
Serwaa was born on 8 March 1990 as the first born to Frank Yeboah and Lydia Tetteh. She went to Yaa Asantewaa Secondary School and studied banking and finance at the Methodist University College, Ghana.

Career 
Serwaa is one of the leading news anchor on GHOne TV and the first Ghanaian to win RTP Awards' Best TV Newscaster of the Year 3-times in a row.
She is the first brand ambassador of AMOR Contraceptive.

Awards and recognition

Personal life 
Serwaa Amihere is also known for her charitable endeavors, she launched Serwaaamihere Foundation a charity/nonprofit organization to make impact in the lives of people.

References

Ghanaian television journalists
21st-century Ghanaian women
Living people
Ghanaian women journalists
1990 births
Yaa Asantewaa Girls' Senior High School alumni